Abas is an extinct genus of diatoms consisting of only one known species: Abas wittii.  Originally observed as a fossil genus classified with diatom spore forms under the name Syringidium. Abas was observed to be live from the  Eocene to Oligocene epoch appearing in tropical sites.

References

Diatoms